Alumot (lit. "Sheaves") is a kibbutz in northern Israel. Located to the south of the Sea of Galilee, it falls under the jurisdiction of Emek HaYarden Regional Council.

History
Kibbutz Alumot was formed in 1936 by a kvutza of graduates of the Ben Shemen Agricultural School. In 1940, the group moved to a temporary site known as "Poria Alumot" (now Poria Illit). They earned a living from agriculture and a sanatorium, Beit Alumot. In 1947 they established a permanent settlement on a hill overlooking Lake Kinneret and the Jordan Valley. Due to a shortage of water, agricultural land and new members, the kibbutz was dismantled in 1969 and re-established the following year by immigrants from Argentina.

In 2008, President Shimon Peres visited the kibbutz, which he helped to found, with his children. Peres' daughter Tzvia (Tziki) Walden was born there. Before the establishment of the state, Peres  worked on the kibbutz as a shepherd and a farmer.

Economy
Alumot breeds livestock and also runs a guest house with beach facilities and a water park.

Notable people
 Shimon Peres, Prime Minister and President

References

Kibbutzim
Kibbutz Movement
Populated places established in 1947
1947 establishments in Mandatory Palestine
Populated places in Northern District (Israel)
Argentine-Jewish culture in Israel
Sea of Galilee